The 208th Independent Infantry Brigade (Home) was a short-lived Home Defence formation of the British Army during the Second World War.

Origin
The brigade was formed for service in the United Kingdom on 6 October 1940, by No 8 Infantry Training Group in Scottish Command. It was commanded by Brigadier R.N. Stewart and composed of newly raised infantry battalions.

Service
During its service the brigade came under the administrative control of several higher formations: 55th (West Lancashire) Infantry Division (16 October–6 November 1940), 42nd (East Lancashire) Infantry Division (6 November 1940 – 20 February 1941), and then  became an integral part of Essex County Division from its formation until disbandment on 7 October 1941.

The brigade remained in the United Kingdom throughout its service and was itself disbanded on 17 October 1941.

Order of battle
The composition of 208th Brigade was as follows:
 13th Battalion, King's Regiment (Liverpool) (6 October 1940 – 13 October 1941)
 9th Battalion, Lancashire Fusiliers (6–30 October 1940)
 10th Battalion, Lancashire Fusiliers (18 October 1940 – 14 October 1941)
 22nd Battalion, Royal Fusiliers (18 October 1940 – 22 July 1941, converted in February 1942 to the 94th Anti-Tank Regiment, Royal Artillery)
 7th Battalion, York and Lancaster Regiment (17 December 1940 – 13 October 1941)

References

Sources
 
 Land Forces of Britain, the Empire and Commonwealth

Military units and formations established in 1940
Infantry brigades of the British Army
Infantry brigades of the British Army in World War II
Military units and formations disestablished in 1941